Santee National Wildlife Refuge is a  refuge alongside Lake Marion, an impoundment of the Santee River of Clarendon County, South Carolina.

Geology
The refuge lies within the Atlantic Coastal Plain province of South Carolina. 
One of the features of the refuge is Dingle Pond, which is a Carolina Bay.

Human history
The refuge contains the Santee Native American mound, which is the farthest eastern known representation of the Mississippian culture. Later built upon this same mound was the Revolutionary British Fort Watson, which was taken by Marion's Brigade in April 1781. The site has been an important site of archeological investigations.

The refuge was established in 1941. The refuge was formerly much larger, but was reduced greatly in size in 1976 when the Lake Moultrie section in Berkeley County was discontinued due to lease termination.

Ecology
The refuge is especially important because its many wetlands support migratory birds.
Within the refuge, which consists of mixed hardwoods and pines, marsh, old croplands, impoundments and open water, is a large diversity of wildlife, including bald eagles, and even the peregrine falcon. More common are deer, raccoons, bobcats, alligators, teal, wood ducks, Canada geese, mallards, pintails, red-tailed hawks, red-shouldered hawks, and wild turkeys.

References

External links
Santee National Wildlife Refuge

The refuge consists of four units, Bluff with the Visitor Center, Pine Island, Dingle Pond with a Carolina Bay, and Cuddo the largest unit. The visitor center is open Tuesday through Friday, 8am to 4pm, but may be closed due to volunteer availability.  Call ahead to be certain. The Cuddo unit is closed on Mondays.

Protected areas of Clarendon County, South Carolina
National Wildlife Refuges in South Carolina
Wetlands of South Carolina
Landforms of Clarendon County, South Carolina
Protected areas established in 1941
1941 establishments in South Carolina